Curtis Frye (born October 20, 1951, in Vass, North Carolina) is the head coach for the University of South Carolina Track and Field teams. He served as an assistant coach for the United States women's track and field team at the 2004 Summer Olympics in Athens, Greece.

Fry's coaching specialties are the hurdling events, sprints, and relays. These are also his areas of responsibility on the US Women's Olympic team.

Before coming to South Carolina, Frye was an assistant coach at East Carolina University, the University of Florida, North Carolina State University, and the University of North Carolina at Chapel Hill.

At Florida he coached Dennis Mitchell, who went on to win the bronze medal in the 100 meter dash at the 1992 Summer Olympics in Barcelona.

At North Carolina, he coached athletes such as Marion Jones and Allen Johnson. Johnson still trains with Frye in Columbia, South Carolina and is a volunteer assistant coach for the Gamecocks.

At South Carolina, some of his most successful athletes include Terrence Trammell, Demetria Washington, Miki and Lisa Barber, Otis Harris, Aleen Bailey, Lashinda Demus, Natasha Hastings and Tiffany Ross-Williams.

His teams have consistently finished high in the four NCAA championship events and the women team won the national title in the 2002 NCAA Women's Outdoor Track and Field Championship, the school's first NCAA Championship title. That year he was named the national coach of the year.

Frye also formed the Speed Elite, a group of high quality athletes like Johnson and Monique Hennagan, that have the goal to compete in and win national and international competitions.

Curtis Frye puts a high value on education and ensures that all of his student athletes graduate from college. Of the almost 200 individuals he has coached at the University of South Carolina, all but one have finished their undergraduate work and earned a degree from the school.

Achievements

 2008 Order of Ikkos medallion
 2002 Women's NCAA Championship
 1999 & 2002 Women's Outdoor SEC Championship
 1999 & 2002 USTCA Women's Outdoor National Coach of the Year
 1999 USTCA Men's National Indoor Coach of the Year
 1999 & 2002 SEC Women's Coach of the Year
 In 2002 coached athletes who won 7 NCAA titles and 4 gold and one silver medal at the World Junior Championships. In addition had 2 named National Athlete of the Years and 1 named Men's National Scholar-Athlete of the Year
 2001 Nike Coach of the Year
 U.S. Men's Head Coach at 2001 Goodwill Games
 1999 Assistant Coach for the US at the World Track and Field Championships
 1997 USOC Track and Field Coach of the Year
 Assistant coach of 18 ACC Championship Teams
 Coached 6 Olympic medalists
 Coached 25 Olympians (that have won 11 medals)
 Coached over 60 NCAA Champions
 Coached over 415 NCAA All-Americans
 Coached over 100 SEC Champions
 Coached over 75 ACC Champions

References
Fry's Bio at GamecocksOnline.com
Fry's Bio at USA Track & Field

East Carolina University alumni
South Carolina Gamecocks track and field coaches
East Carolina Pirates track and field coaches
Florida Gators track and field coaches
NC State Wolfpack track and field coaches
North Carolina Tar Heels track and field coaches
American track and field coaches
Living people
1951 births